This article features the videography of Albanian singer Elvana Gjata. Her videography includes numerous music video as well as several appearances in films, television shows and television commercials.

Music videos

As lead artist

As featured artist

Television

Films

References 

Videography
Videographies of Albanian artists
Videographies